Night Song is an album by pianist Mike LeDonne which was recorded in 2005 and released on the Savant label.

Reception

In his review on Allmusic, Scott Yanow states "Pianist Mike LeDonne, whose main influence is McCoy Tyner, mostly sounds pretty original throughout this swinging trio set ... Mike LeDonne is the main star throughout and is heard in prime form. Recommended". In JazzTimes, Thomas Conrad wrote "LeDonne is a deeply middle-of-the-road mainstream-modern pianist who lacks any signature stylistic manifestations that would give his work a clearly identifiable personality. But he is highly proficient and swings at all tempos. He also has taste. Night Song is a quality project throughout"

Track listing 
 "Night Song" (Lee Adams, Charles Strouse) – 6:43	
 "JB" (Mike LeDonne) – 5:31
 "After the Rain" (John Coltrane) – 7:36
 "I Should Care" (Axel Stordahl, Paul Weston, Sammy Cahn) – 7:54
 "Don't You Worry 'bout a Thing" (Stevie Wonder) – 8:06
 "In a Sentimental Mood" (Duke Ellington) – 6:25
 "Toys" (Herbie Hancock) – 7:14
 "Continuum" (LeDonne) – 7:26
 "Alone Together" (Arthur Schwartz, Howard Dietz) – 4:42

Personnel 
Mike LeDonne – piano 
Ron Carter – bass 
Joe Farnsworth – drums

References 

Mike LeDonne albums
2005 albums
Savant Records albums
Albums recorded at Van Gelder Studio